Matti Aikio ( born Mathis Isaksen; 18 June 1872  in Karasjok – 25 July 1929 in Oslo) was a Norwegian Sami writer. He was one of the first Sami writers in Norway. Due to his excellent performance at the county school in Vadsø he got one of the two seats that were reserved for Sami people at the teacher seminar in Tromsø in 1890. This was his first encounter with the Norwegian language.

References 

1872 births
1929 deaths
People from Karasjok
Norwegian Sámi people
Norwegian Sámi-language writers